George Herbert Palmer (Grantchester, 9 August 1846 - Oxford, 20 June 1926) was an English Anglo-Catholic priest, musicologist, organist, and expert on plainchant, particularly of the Sarum Use. Named after the priest and poet George Herbert, he was ordained a priest in Chester in 1871 and later was organist of St Margaret's Church in Toxteth Park, Liverpool, and St Barnabas, Pimlico, London. He helped found the Plainsong and Medieval Music Society (PMMS) in 1888. The majority of his extensive editions of liturgical music and texts were produced by the PMMS and the Community of St Mary the Virgin at Wantage in Oxfordshire.
He was notable and influential for his musically sensitive translations of Latin hymns into English.

Works
The Antiphoner and Grail: Being the Words of the Antiphons and Hymns at Mattins and Evening, and also of the Introits, Graduals, and Sequences at the Holy Eucharist, Derived Mainly from the Sarum Breviary and Missal, and Adapted to the Use of the Book of Common Prayer (1880)
The Hymner, Containing Translations of Hymns from the Sarum and Other English Service-books, Supplemented by Sequences from Various Sources (1891)
The Office Hymn-Book, Part II: Harmonies for Organists (1891)
The Sarum Psalter, 1894
The Introduction and Tone-Table to the Sarum Psalter (1898)
The Psalms of David, Pointed to the Eight Gregorian Tones as Given in the Sarum Tonale (1898)
The Order of Compline from the Sarum Breviary (1899)
The Order of Vespers from the Sarum Breviary (1899)
The Responds at Vespers throughout the Year, with the Musical Notation, from the Salisbury Antiphoner (1899-1902)
Proper of the Season, Advent
Christmas to Lent
Lent and Passion-tide
Common of Saints
The Order of Compline Throughout the Year: With the Musical Notation from the Salisbury Antiphoner (1899)
The Antiphons to Magnificat Throughout the Year: From the Sarum Breviary (1900)
A Selection of Offices, Grails and Alleluyas for Sundays and Festivals from the Sarum Gradale (1900)
volume one
Additional Settings of Certain of the Canticles at Mattins and Evensong adapted from Sarum Service-books (1902)
Requiem Services, Containing the Music of Vespers and Mass, Together with the Order for the Burial of the Dead (1902-1903)
The Order for 'Placebo' or Vespers of the Dead, with the Musical Notation from the Salisbury Antiphoner
The Musick of the Mass for the Dead Adapted to the English Text from the Sarum Manuale
The Order for the Burial of the Dead Adapted to Plain-Chant from the Sarum Antiphoner
The Hymner: Containing Translations of the Hymns from the Sarum Breviary Together with Sundry Sequences and Processions (1905)
The Great Advent Antiphons: With the Musical Notation from the Salisbury Antiphoner (1910)
Salve festa dies: A Hymn for Easter Day, with Words and Musick Drawn from the Sarum Processionale (1912)
The Psalms and Canticles at Mattins and Evensong Pointed to the Eight Gregorian Tones from the Sarum Tonale (1920)
The Diurnal After the Use of the Illustrious Church of Salisbury (1921-1930).
The Diurnal Noted: From the Salisbury Use, translated into English and Adapted to the Original Music-note (1926)
The Order of Tenebrae, Or Mattins and Lauds, of the Last Three Days of Holy Week, from the Salisbury Antiphoner (1929)
The Antiphons upon Benedictus from the Salisbury Antiphoner (1958)

References

19th-century English Anglican priests
20th-century English Anglican priests
1846 births
1926 deaths
People from Grantchester
English Anglo-Catholics
English musicians